Simnia patula is a species of sea snail, a marine gastropod mollusk in the family Ovulidae, the ovulids, cowry allies or false cowries.

Features

 It is up to 0,8 cm in diameter and 2 cm in length. 

 Small, shiny, oval-shell, convoluted. 

 The elongated oval aperture is narrower than the rest of the shell, with flared lips. 
 A shell that is white, yellow or pinkish. 
 With brown stripes and spots mainly on the mantle, the body is yellow. 
 The mantle has two flaps which, when the animal is active, cover the mantle.

References

Ovulidae
Molluscs described in 1777
Taxa named by Thomas Pennant